The Hills Football League (HFL) is an Australian rules football league, situated in the Adelaide Hills region of South Australia, to the south east of the state capital Adelaide.

The League has over 3000 players belonging to 20 member Clubs.  The League's Clubs are divided into two playing Divisions
- Division 1 (Formerly Central Division - mostly the larger towns in the Hills region); 
- Division 2 (Formerly Country Division - the remaining clubs in the region).

Both divisions have their own programs for the season. There is a promotion and relegation system that received criticism in 2014 following the ultimately unsuccessful decision to relegate Echunga in the same season that they won the Central Division premiership. It is the second biggest league in South Australia after the South Australian Amateur Football League.

In 2009 the Uraidla Districts Football Club became the first team in HFL history to secure all senior premierships (A,B&C) in a single season a feat that was followed by Hahndorf in 2016.

History
The Hills FL was formed in 1967 as a result of the merger of the original Hills Central FL and the Torrens Valley FL. For a number of years, the competition consisted of three divisions, firstly known as the Central Zone, the Northern Zone and the Southern Zone. This later changed to Zone 1, 2 and 3 with two years also providing a Zone 4. Eventually in 1979 the two divisions that exist today was established. The one year that was an exception was 1983 when competition was played in one division.

Heathfield-Aldgate United hold the record for the most premierships won in succession from 1971 to 1977.

Grades
The HFL consists of:
Junior Grades
Under 14's (mini colts) 
Under 16's (junior colts)
Under 18's (senior colts)
Senior Grades
A Grade(A1)
B Grade(A2)
C Grade(A3)

Division 1

Premierships

 1967 - Heathfield-Aldgate United
 1968 - Heathfield-Aldgate United
 1969 - Mount Barker
 1970 - Mount Barker
 1971 - Heathfield-Aldgate United
 1972 - Heathfield-Aldgate United
 1973 - Heathfield-Aldgate United
 1974 - Heathfield-Aldgate United
 1975 - Heathfield-Aldgate United
 1976 - Heathfield-Aldgate United
 1977 - Heathfield-Aldgate United
 1978 - Onkaparinga Valley
 1979 - Uraidla
 1980 - Uraidla
 1981 - Lobethal
 1982 - Mount Barker
 1983 - Mount Barker
 1984 - Hahndorf
 1985 - Hahndorf
 1986 - Mount Lofty District
 1987 - Eastern Rangers
 1988 - Blackwood
 1989 - Uraidla
 1990 - Mount Lofty District
 1991 - Blackwood
 1992 - Hahndorf
 1993 - Hahndorf
 1994 - Onkaparinga Valley
 1995 - Hahndorf
 1996 - Uraidla
 1997 - Hahndorf
 1998 - Lobethal
 1999 - Lobethal
 2000 - Mount Barker
 2001 - Hahndorf
 2002 - Lobethal
 2003 - Mount Barker
 2004 - Mount Barker
 2005 - Uraidla Districts
 2006 - Mount Lofty District
 2007 - Mount Lofty District
 2008 - Mount Lofty District
 2009 - Uraidla Districts
 2010 - Uraidla Districts
 2011 - Uraidla Districts
 2012 - Mount Barker
 2013 - Uraidla Districts
 2014 - Echunga
 2015 - Hahndorf
 2016 - Hahndorf
 2017 - Blackwood
 2018 - Hahndorf
 2019 - Hahndorf
 2020 - Hahndorf
 2021 - Hahndorf
 2022 - Lobethal

Division 2

Premierships
 
 1967 Pleasant Valley
 1968 Pleasant Valley
 1969 Pleasant Valley
 1970 Gumeracha
 1971 Pleasant Valley
 1972 Kersbrook
 1973 Birdwood
 1974 Kersbrook
 1975 Birdwood
 1976 Birdwood
 1977 Birdwood
 1978 Lenswood Rangers
 1979 Lenswood Rangers
 1980 Macclesfield
 1981 Bridgewater
 1982 Gumeracha
 1983 No Division 2
 1984 Gumeracha
 1985 Nairne Bremer
 1986 Kersbrook
 1987 Barossa District
 1988 Barossa District
 1989 Nairne Bremer
 1990 Barossa District
 1991 Mount Torrens
 1992 Birdwood 
 1993 Kersbrook
 1994 Birdwood
 1995 Echunga
 1996 Echunga
 1997 Kersbrook 
 1998 Ironbank-Cherry Gardens
 1999 Ironbank-Cherry Gardens
 2000 Echunga
 2001 Meadows
 2002 Meadows
 2003 Meadows
 2004 Meadows
 2005 Torrens Valley
 2006 Kangarilla
 2007 Torrens Valley
 2008 Kersbrook
 2009 Kersbrook
 2010 Torrens Valley
 2011 Echunga
 2012 Kersbrook
 2013 Echunga
 2014 Mount Lofty District
 2015 Kersbrook
 2016 Bridgewater Callington
 2017 Nairne Bremer
 2018 Ironbank-Cherry Gardens
 2019 Gumeracha
 2020 Ironbank-Cherry Gardens
 2021 Kersbrook
 2022 Gumeracha

Former Clubs

AFL Players
The following were drafted to AFL club lists having previously participated in the Hills Football League.

References

External links 
Hills Football League Official Site
Country Footy (Central)
Country Footy (Country)
Full Points Footy

Books
 Encyclopedia of South Australian country football clubs / compiled by Peter Lines. 
 South Australian country football digest / by Peter Lines 

Australian rules football competitions in South Australia